The National Broadcasting Corporation of Papua New Guinea (NBC PNG) is Papua New Guinea's state owned broadcaster. Its head office is in Boroko, Port Moresby, and has approximately 20 locations around the country.  It operates two national radio stations – NBC Radio (90.7 FM) and Tribe 92FM (92.3FM) – and one television station NBC TV (formerly Kundu 2 and National Television Service).

NBC was established under the Broadcasting Commission Act (authority of Parliament) on 1 December 1973 and was known as National Broadcasting Commission, until 1994 when it took the present name.

NBC Radio 
NBC Radio is the radio division of NBC PNG.

Main station 
The main station broadcasts on frequency 90.7 FM and 585 MW on AM band.

Weekday Programming (Main)

Tribe 92FM 
Tribe 92FM is the NBC's younger arm of radio that hosts music and talk for a younger audience. It broadcasts on frequency 92.3 FM to parts of Papua New Guinea.

Tribe as a Segment on NBC Radio 

In 2008, Tribe was created as a segment every Saturday nights from 9pm to 12 Midnight on NBC Radio to talk about issues faced and  trending topics regarding the young voices of PNG. The hosts during that time consisted of Dylan Mallar, Josephine Oberleutter and Vinna Wingur.

Tribe 92FM as a station 
In August 2015, the segment became a fully fledged radio station with the inclusion of new personalities following the departure of Dylan and Josephine. The new personalities or 'Tribers' included, Alice Ashwin, Heidee Woito, Olivia Jimmy, Jivannah Thavala, James Leia, Michael Sanginumbuk, Michael Arifeae and Timothy Vanua headed by then Executive Producer for Tribe Shane Amean. Further departures followed with Olivia, Jivannah, Alice, Michael Sanginumbuk (to NBC TV) and Timothy Vanua (to National Radio).  New  Tribers included, Raymond Polon, Hazel Parpa, Maureen Orea in 2017 followed by Jason Omba, Tamal Watt and Ishmael Saulep in 2020. The current Executive Producer is Matilda Gaveva.

Weekday Programming (Tribe 92FM)

NBC Provincial Radio Stations 

 Radio New Ireland
 Radio Chimbu
 Radio Enga
 Radio Southern Highlands
 Radio Sandaun
 Rado East Sepik
 Radio Madang
 Radio Central
 Radio Gulf
 Radio Western
 Radio Northern
 Radio Morobe
 Radio Milne Bay
 Radio Eastern Highlands
 Radio Western Highlands
 Radio Manus
 Radio East Britain
 Radio West New Britain
 Radio Bougainville

Social media

NBC Television 
NBC TV, formerly known as Kundu 2 Television and National Television Service, is the television division of NBC PNG. It was launched on 16 September 2008 as a platform for the National Government to provide information services for Papua New Guineans.

See also 
 Communications in Papua New Guinea

References

External links 

 Tribe92FM Facebook page
 Tribe92FM Twitter account
 Tribe92FM Instagram account
 NBC Radio PNG Facebook page
 NBC Radio PNG Twitter account
 NBC News PNG Facebook page
 NBC Archives Facebook page
 NBC PNG YouTube Channel

Radio in Papua New Guinea
Communications in Papua New Guinea
Mass media in Papua New Guinea
Television stations in Papua New Guinea